Transmission Films is an Australian and New Zealand film distribution company based in Sydney, Australia and Auckland, New Zealand
founded in 2008 by Richard Payten and Andrew Mackie.

History
Transmission Films was founded in 2008 by Richard Payten and Andrew Mackie, who were previously general managers at Dendy Films. It initially launched in partnership with Paramount Pictures, but in 2015 signed a multi-year home entertainment output deal with Sony Pictures.

As of 2009, Transmission was doing the physical distribution work for Australian film distribution company Footprint Films.

Transmission has released a number of films into the Australian and New Zealand market, including Rare Exports, The King's Speech, Amour, Samson & Delilah, The Railway Man, Calvary, Shame, Tracks, Mr. Turner, Holding the Man, Suffragette, Carol and Brooklyn. It has also released a number of successful New Zealand films into the NZ market including The World's Fastest Indian, Boy, The Dark Horse and The Dead Lands.

Description
The company is based in Sydney. It is a sister company of See-Saw Films, an Oscar-winning producer of films as The King's Speech, Shame and Lion.

Ranking
In May 2012, The Australian called Transmission Films principals Andrew Mackie and Richard Payten the 23rd most influential individuals in the Australian arts. In 2014 Transmission Films was ranked as the best-reviewed Australian distributor across all episodes of the TV series At The Movies.

Film distributions

See also

List of film production companies
List of television production companies

References

External links
Official website

Film production companies of Australia
Mass media companies established in 2008
2008 establishments in Australia